France D'Amour (born France Rochon on March 30, 1967, in Mont-Rolland, Sainte-Adèle, Quebec, Canada) is a French Canadian singer songwriter from Quebec.

She studied music at Collège Lionel-Groulx in Sainte-Thérèse, Quebec specialising in jazz and playing guitar. Later, she was part of various musical formations, notably U-Bahn, The Answer and France. In 1992, she gained great fame with her debut album Animal that was certified gold in Quebec. In 2002, she had success in France as well through her collaboration with Jean-Jacques Goldman, who co-wrote the album with his team (Robert Goldman, Jacques Veneruso, Christophe Battaglia, Erick Benzi and Gildas Arzel).

She has also appeared on stage and in film. In 1998, she played the role of Esmeralda in a French tour version of the musical comedy Notre-Dame-de-Paris. She also appeared in a secondary role in the film Les Boys 3 as well as in the film's soundtrack.
 
France d'Amour has a son, François, born in 1988. In April 2011, she also confirmed during a popular talk show on Quebec television Tout le monde en parle that she followed the Church of Scientology for almost 20 years.

Discography

Albums
1992: Animal
1994: Déchaînée
1998: Le Silence des roses
2002: France D'Amour
2005: Hors de tout doute
2007: Les autres
2009: Le présent
2011: Bubble Bath & Champagne
2013: En love majeur
2016: Bubble Bath & Champagne, Volume 2
2019: D'Amour et Rock&roll

Compilation albums
2000: Nomade (compilation)
2018: Best of (compilation)

References

External links
Official website

20th-century Canadian women singers
1967 births
Living people
Singers from Quebec
Canadian women singer-songwriters
French-language singers of Canada
21st-century Canadian women singers
Canadian women pop singers
Scientologists